The Lotus Exige  is a British two-door, two-seat sports car made by Lotus Cars since 2000. Originally a more-hardcore coupé version of the Lotus Elise roadster, since the Series 3 the Exige has been the larger-engined model of the family - using a V6 engine in place of the Elise's straight-four with convertible versions of both available.

Series 1 

The original Exige was launched in 2000 with a naturally aspirated 1.8 L Rover K Series Inline-four engine in VHPD (Very High Performance Derivative) tune. There was also a "track spec" version with  available.

The first generation Exige bodywork was based on that of the Series 1 Elise, which was produced from 1996-2000, although the Elise was updated soon after the introduction of the Exige. The Exige added a non-removable hardtop, "fastback", kamm-tail style rear bodywork with a tinted transparent engine cover and a pylon-mounted rear wing. Front air intakes (blanked on the road cars) and a front splitter were added. Both front and rear bodywork clamshells were widened to accept a wider wheel track. The Series 1 was built until 2001. 604 examples in total were made and the car was not replaced until the Series 2 of 2004.

Series 2

Exige (2004–2006) 
In 2004, the Series 2 Exige was introduced. Compared to the Series 2 Elise, it has a front splitter, a fibreglass hardtop roof with roof scoop, a rear engine cover, and rear spoiler.

In February 2005, Lotus announced a limited production run of 50 Exiges, using the Toyota engine with a supercharger. These models were only available in yellow or black, representing the colours of Lotus Sport, and are badged 240R.

The North American Exige was unveiled at the Los Angeles Auto Show in January 2006.

Engine
Toyota Supplied,  I4, DOHC with VVTL-i (variable valve timing with lift intelligence) - Designed by Yamaha - Engine Code: 2ZZ-GE
Bore/Stroke 
  at 7,800 rpm
   at 6,800 rpm
Compression ratio: 11.5:1

Transmission
6-Speed manual built by Aisin AI, close-ratio with single-plate dry clutch

Performance
0-: 4.7 seconds
0-: 12.9 seconds
Top speed: 
Fuel consumption:  city /  highway

Exige S 

The S was also made available in North American markets as a 2007 model.

According to Lotus, the Exige S model, weighing , has the following specifications:

Engine
Toyota supplied,  I4, DOHC with VVTL-i (variable valve timing and lift - intelligent), supercharged and intercooled
Bore/Stroke 
  at 7,800 rpm
  at 5,500 rpm
Compression ratio: 11.5:1

Transmission
6-speed, close ratio with single-plate dry clutch

Performance
0-: 4.1 seconds
0-: 9.98 seconds
Top speed: 
Fuel consumption:  city /  highway

Exige Sport 240 (2008) 

In 2007, Lotus released the Exige Sport 240, limited to 6 units for the Australian market only. At the time, the Sport 240 was the fastest Lotus ever sold in Australia. The Sport 240 in fitted with Lotus Sport adjustable traction control, developed by from the Lotus Sport UK GT3 motorsport program. The system features a driver-adjustable control knob with 18 different presets of traction control as well as electronic launch control. The Sport 240's brakes were also upgraded, with AP Racing four-piston calipers with  two-piece vented discs and braided hoses on the front, and Brembo single-piston calipers with  rotors in the rear. Pagid Racing brake pads are fitted all around. The suspension utilises one-way adjustable dampers with adjustable ride height and an adjustable front sway bar. The Sport 240 comes equipped with R compound Yokohama A048 LTS tyres, 195/50x16 in the front, and 225/45x17 in the rear. It also includes a BS4 T45 steel roll-over hoop and struts. The interior also receives it's fair share of upgrades, including elements of a Touring Plus package. It comes with a lightened,  air conditioning system, sports seats finished in black leather with a harness bar. It features an orange Exige logo on the seats and floor mats, door trims, centre console and stitching. The car also received Lotus Sport forged 5-spoke OZ Racing alloy wheels, body mods including a roof scoop to supply more air to the intercooler, two bespoke colour choices (Blaze Orange and Sapphire Black), and limited edition badging. The Blaze Orange models received blacked out highlights including the front splitter, rear wing endplates, wheels and a rear beaver panel infill around the taillights. The Sapphire Black models received a Chrome Orange front splitter and rear wing endplates. The Sport 240 went on sale at the 2007 Australian International Motor Show at a price of $149,990.

Exige S 240 (2008–2011) 

In 2008, the Exige S was replaced by the Exige S 240. The S 240 also received upgraded AP Racing brakes from the Exige Cup 240 and a larger roof scoop utilised by the Exige Cup 255. 0-97 km/h (0–60 mph) times improved to 4.0 seconds. The S 240 base manufacturer suggested retail price was $65,690.

Exige S 260 (2009–2011) 

After 2009, both the S 240 and S 260 received distinctively new and enlarged rear spoilers mounted to the rear clam instead of the motor bay cover.

Exige 265E 

The Exige 265E is a factory-built version of an Exige S optimised to run on E85 fuel, which is 85% ethanol. The higher octane of this biofuel allows for a higher compression ratio and/or more supercharger boost. In this model, which saw the ECU re-mapped as well as upgraded injectors and fuel pump to cope with the new fuel type, the brakes have also been upgraded to four-piston AP Racing calipers with increased diameter  sport brake pads mated with drilled and vented discs at the front. Brembo single-piston sliding rear calipers with  diameter discs are fitted at the rear. Lotus says it has no intention to build the 265E (265 indicates the approximate horsepower and the E indicates the "environmentally favourable bio-ethanol E85 fuel" powering the engine) as a limited number standard production car, and that it is simply a biofuels demonstrator. According to Lotus, the Exige 265E model has the following specifications:

Engine

Toyota supplied 2ZZ-GE 1,796 cc inline-4, DOHC with VVTL-i (variable valve timing with lift intelligence), supercharged and intercooled
Bore/Stroke 82 mm/85 mm
   at 8,000 rpm
  at 5,500 rpm
Compression ratio: 11.5:1

Transmission
C64 6-Speed, close ratio with single-plate dry clutch

Exige 265E performance

0-60 (0-97 km/h): 3.88 seconds
0-100 mph (0-161 km/h): 9.2 seconds
Top speed: 
Fuel consumption: ~ city /  highway

Exige GT3 prototype (2007)

According to Lotus, the Exige GT3 model has the following specifications:

Engine

Toyota supplied 2ZZ-GE,  inline 4, DOHC with VVTL-i and Lotus T4e engine management system, Eaton M62 Roots type supercharger and intercooled
Bore/Stroke 
 at 8,000 rpm
 at 7,000 rpm
Compression ratio: 11.5:1

Transmission
C64 6-speed, close ratio with uprated clutch and cover, open differential
Gear ratios I/II/III : 3.166:1 / 2.050:1 / 1.481:1
             IV/V/VI : 1.166:1 / 0.916:1 / 0.815:1
       R/final drive : 3.250:1 / 4.529:1

Performance
0- : 3.9 seconds
0- : 4.0 seconds
0- : 9.8 seconds
Top Speed :  - electronically limited

Exige GT3 of Angelo Lazaris (2008–2011) 
The Angelo Lazaris is a version of Exige GT3 for the 2008 GT Championship, based on the European race car that competed in the FIA GT3 category.

The vehicle was unveiled in round three of the 2008 GT Championship.

Union Jack Lotus Exige S (2008) 
The Union Jack is a version of Lotus Exige S with a flying British flag body, developed by Lotus Design.

The car was featured in Discovery Channel's How Do They Do It? series.

Exige Scura/Stealth (2009) 

Orders for the 'Lotus Exige Scura' began from 21 October 2009 in Europe, South Korea, Australia, South Africa, Thailand, Taiwan, Hong Kong, Singapore, New Zealand, Indonesia and Malaysia. The vehicle was sold in Japan as 'Lotus Exige Stealth'.

The Exige Stealth was unveiled at the 2009 Tokyo International Motorshow.

Lotus Exige S RGB Special Edition (2010)
The RGB Special Edition is a version of the Lotus Exige S commemorating Roger Becker, the former Director of Vehicle Engineering for Lotus.

The vehicle went on sale in September 2010, and ended at the end of 2010 in Europe due to changes in legislation and the introduction of "Euro 5" Type Approval which does not apply to vehicles with 1.8-litre 2ZZ VVTL-i engines.

The RGB Special Edition was unveiled at the 2010 LA Auto Show.

Exige Matte Black Final Edition (2011) 
The Final Edition is a limited version of the Lotus Exige for the North American market, commemorating the end of the Exige's production. Only 25 were made.

The Final Edition was unveiled in Pebble Beach Week 2011.

Production 
Production of North American version of Exige ended in August 2011 after the expiration of "smart" airbags exemption, and due to Toyota stopping production of its 2ZZ-GE four-cylinder engine.

Exige S 260 Final Edition (2011) 

To mark the end of an era of Lotus Exige production, Lotus created the Exige S 260 Final Edition, exclusively for North America. With power upgraded to 257 hp, and a high level of standard equipment, the Exige S 260 Final Edition was available in multiple colour choices from the full Lotus colour range. Only 30 examples of this Exige were built, all for the North American market.

Specifications 
 1.8 litre Toyota Supercharged 2ZZ VVTL-I engine producing 257 bhp.
 Full Lotus exterior colour range was available (standard & metallic paints at no extra cost, lifestyle & limited paints at an extra cost).
 Three-element rear wing, splitter, side scoops and roof scoop.
 Body coloured rear wing, splitter, side scoops and roof scoop.
 Double shear track control arm brace.
 Y type 5-spoke forged alloy wheels in black finish (6" Front, 7.5" Rear).
 Limited Slip Differential (LSD)

Upgrade options included 
 Sport Pack: ProBax sport seats, Lotus Traction Control System (TCS), BS4 T45 steel roll-over hoop and struts and Adjustable front anti-roll bar.
 Touring Pack: padded leather door panels, perforated leather door inserts, leather trimmed center console, black perforated leather handbrake-lever gaiter, black carpet mats with embroidered Exige logo, noise insulation material, iPod stereo connection and trinket tray divider and cup holder.
 Track Pack: Track suspension (Ohlins dampers and adjustable ride height)

Series 3

Exige S V6 (2012–2015), Exige S V6 Roadster (2013–2016)

At the Frankfurt 2011 autoshow, the 2012 version of the Exige S was announced. In 2013, a roadster version was introduced with only minor changes to the design for the removable top. The engine and performance were virtually unchanged from the coupe.

Specifications

 Powerplant:  Toyota 2GR-FE Supercharged non-intercooled V6 engine
 Max. power:  at 7,000 rpm
 Max. torque:  at 4,500 rpm.
 Gearbox: 6-speed Toyota EA60 manual transmission; automatic transmission available as an option.
 Weight: .
 Acceleration: 0– in 3.8 seconds; 3.9 seconds for automatic version.
 Top speed: 
 Tyres: Pirelli P Zero Corsa tyres included as standard with optional £800 Pirelli Trofeo R tyres.
The drag coefficient is 0.433.

Exige V6 Cup, Exige V6 Cup R (2013–2016)

The Exige V6 Cup is a track oriented version of the Exige S while the Exige Cup R is the track-only version of Exige V6 Cup. The Exige V6 Cup is offered for sale in the United States as a track only car. If purchased, US Lotus Dealers will only provide a bill of sale instead of a title.
The vehicles were unveiled at the 2013 Autosport International motor show.

Specifications
Exige V6 Cup
According to Lotus, the Exige Cup has the following specifications:
 Transmission: 6-speed Toyota EA60 close ratio manual transmission, Sequential gearbox with paddleshift (optional).
 Layout: Mid mounted, transverse, rear wheel drive.
 Weight: .
 Acceleration: 0-60 mph (97 km/h) in 3.8 seconds.
 Top speed: .
 Suspension: Double wishbone suspension with anti-roll bars (front and rear).
 Brakes:  AP Racing four-piston calipers (front and rear) with ventilated and cross drilled 2 piece discs.
 Tyres: Pirelli P Zero Corsa tyres included as standard

Exige V6 Cup R
The Lotus Exige V6 Cup R has the following specifications according to Lotus:
 Transmission: 6-speed Toyota EA60 close ratio manual transmission, Sequential gearbox with paddleshift (optional).
 Layout: Mid mounted, transverse, rear wheel drive.
 Weight:  (dry weight).
 Acceleration: 0-60 mph (97 km/h) in 3.8 seconds.
 Top speed: .
 Suspension: Double wishbone suspension with anti-roll bars (front and rear).
 Brakes: AP Racing four-piston calipers (front and rear) with ventilated and cross drilled 2 piece discs.
 Tyres: Pirelli P Zero Corsa tyres included as standard

Lotus Exige 360 Cup (2015–present)
Limited to 50 examples, Lotus Exige 360 Cup was revealed on 14 August 2015. The car is powered by a 3.5-liter supercharged Toyota V6 delivering . On the outside, these Exiges wear new lightweight pieces for the front access panel and louvered rear tailgate. The rest of the body uses the V6 Cup's aero package that produces 93 pounds of downforce at 100 miles per hour. Improved brake discs are hidden behind Motorsport Red wheels, and each car comes with a numbered build plate. They're eligible to race in the Lotus Cup series, and for those really wanting to hit the track, the options include adjustable anti-roll bars, Öhlins dampers, a fire extinguisher, electrical cut-off, FIA carbon seats, air conditioning, and a removable steering wheel.

Specifications
The Exige 360 Cup has the following specifications as stated by Lotus:
Transmission: 6-speed Toyota EA60 close ratio manual transmission, Sequential gearbox with paddleshift (optional).
Layout: Mid mounted, transverse, rear wheel drive.
Weight:  (dry weight).
Acceleration: 0-60 mph (97 km/h) in 3.8 seconds.
Top speed: .
Suspension: Double wishbone suspension with anti-roll bars (front and rear).
Brakes:  AP Racing four-piston calipers (front and rear) with ventilated and cross drilled 2 piece discs.
Power to weight ratio: 307 hp/tonne (311 PS/1000 kg).

Lotus Exige Sport 350 (2015-2019), Sport 350 Roadster (2016-2019) 
Revealed on 9 December 2015, the Lotus Exige Sport 350 is the replacement for the Exige S and the ultimate incarnation Lotus’ mid-engined V6 coupe. It's lighter and faster than the Exige S and is the next step on Lotus CEO Jean-Marc Gales' ladder to recovery for the British sports car maker. The Toyota 3.5-litre supercharged V6 underneath is unchanged, though. However, Lotus has been through the Exige S, stripping weight wherever possible, tweaking the chassis and generally fettling the entire package. The initial plan had been to fit the Evora’s 400bhp engine to the Exige, but in doing so it would have meant the engineers couldn’t get the car below the 1,200kg target weight set by Gales. And its weight loss that has been the key focus, with 51kg taken out of the car reducing the kerb weight to 1,125kg. The manual gearbox has been heavily revised, giving more precise and quicker shifting. The gearshift mechanism uses light weight machined and cast aluminium components which are so technically aesthetically appealing they are no longer hidden within the transmission tunnel but exposed through an open-gate design, further reducing weight.

The Roadster variant is revealed in 2016 Geneva Motor Show. Like the coupé, the car features a carbon-fibre tailgate and side intakes, and there’s also a lightweight battery and engine mounts.

Lotus Exige Sport 380 (2016–2021)
The Lotus Exige Sport 380 is a track focused and more powerful version of the Lotus Exige lineup. It was unveiled on 23 November 2016. Lotus' CEO, Jean-Marc Gales describes it as, "The Exige Sport 380 is so good, that it is no longer the best in class, it’s now in a class of its own", and it fulfills this statement by taking on some of the powerful and expensive super cars both on the track and the streets. The interior is also stripped out and features necessary driver aids. The Exige Sport 380 weighs , thanks to the extensive use of carbon fiber on the exterior as well as the interior, the application of polycarbonate windows instead of traditional glass windows and a newly designed rear transom panel which features two rear lights instead of four.

Lotus Exige Cup 380 (2016–present)
The Lotus Exige Cup 380 is a more hardcore variant of the Exige Sport 380. Performance of the car remains the same as the Sport 380 but it features more aero components and a larger rear wing to produce more downforce at high speeds. It features a more stripped out interior in order to save weight and other light weight carbon fiber components, Lotus states a lowest possible dry weight of only .

Lotus Exige Cup 430 (2017–present)

On 9 November 2017, Lotus unveiled the most powerful version of the Exige to date called the Exige Cup 430, producing  and using the Evora GT430's powertrain, modified to fit in the smaller Exige. The car body can produce  of downforce. The Cup 430 is  lighter than the Sport 380 due to the use of carbon fibre in body panels and interior and a titanium exhaust. The gearbox allows quicker gearshifts than the previous model. The Cup 430 is not offered with an automatic gearbox. The Lotus Exige Cup 430 is capable of covering the Hethel circuit in 1 minute 24.8 seconds – the fastest production car to lap the circuit – 1.2 seconds faster than the road going Lotus 3-Eleven.

Specifications
The Exige Cup 430 has the following specifications according to Lotus:
Transmission: 6-speed Toyota EA60 close ratio manual transmission with gearbox cooler coupled to Lotus developed aluminium precision shift mechanism.
Layout: Mid mounted, transverse, rear wheel drive.
Weight:  (lowest possible dry weight, after the removal of optional airbags).
Acceleration: 0-60 mph (97 km/h) in 3.2 seconds.
Top speed: .
Suspension: Double wishbone suspension with anti-roll bars (front and rear).
Brakes: AP Racing four-piston calipers (front and rear) with ventilated and cross drilled 2 piece discs.
Tires: Michelin Pilot Sport Cup 2 tyres (front 215/45 R17, rear 285/30 R18).
Power to weight ratio: 407 hp/tonne (413 PS/1000 kg).

Lotus Exige Sport 410 (2018-2021) 
On 4 May 2018, Lotus unveiled Exige Sport 410 to augment the current Exige lineup. It will bridge the gap between the track-focused Exige Cup 430 and road-biased Exige Sport 350. It shares much of is running gear with former, however the settings have been dialed back to establish a suitable character for both road and track driving. Mid-mounted is the 430 Cup’s, supercharged 3.5-litre V6 engine. Away from the oily bits, the Exige Sport 410 is fitted with a new front end, which will be applied across the Exige range. It features enlarged air intakes and new air curtains, which improve cooling efficiency and reduce drag respectively. Further aero-based addenda, including the front splitter, rear-wing and aluminum diffuser combine to generate 150kg of downforce. True to Lotus form, little carbon-fibre has been spared to build the Exige Sport 410, so it weighs-in as the lightest V6 Exige to date at 1,054kg (dry). Keeping the mass in check is the same suspension setup from the 430 Cup, comprising three-way adjustable nitron dampers and Eibach anti-rolls bars, at both ends.

Lotus Exige Sport 390, Sport 420, Cup 430 Final Edition (2021) 

On 9 February 2021, Lotus unveiled three final editions line-up models of Exige on online platforms. 

Opening the line-up is the Exige Sport 390 Final Edition. The British brand claims a 0-100km/h sprint time of 3.8 seconds, towards to a top speed of 276km/h. The 'entry-level' Exige tips the scales in at 1138kg – making it the heaviest (just) of the three model variants. This advanced aerodynamic package – comprising a splitter, diffuser, and spoiler– produces 70kg of downforce at the rear and 45kg up front, for a total of 115kg at top speed. Two 17-inch front and two 18-inch rear 10-spoke forged alloy wheels hide in the wheel wells, wrapped in 205/45 front and 265/35 rear Michelin Pilot Sport 4 tyres.

Sitting above the Sport 390 is the Exige Sport 420 Final Edition. Weighing 1110kg, stopping power comes from AP Racing brakes, with forged four-piston calipers and two-piece J-Hook brake discs at all four corners. Adjustable Eibach anti-roll bars and three-way adjustable Nitron dampers are standard, as are 17-inch front and 18-inch lightweight forged alloy wheels wrapped in 215/45 front and 285/30 rear Michelin Pilot Sport Cup 2 rubber.

This variant picks up carbon-fibre panels on the front splitter, front access panel, roof, diffuser surround, air-intake side pods, one-piece tailgate, and rear wing – good for 171kg of downforce at its top speed of 280km/h. The lower-grade Exige Sport 420's suspension, tyre and brake packages carry over to the top-spec car, though the Cup 430 gains diamond-cut 17-inch front and 18-inch rear alloy wheels, a high-flow titanium sports exhaust, and a multi-mode traction control system.

The Lotus Emira was launched on 6th July 2021 and went on sale in March 2022. It replaced the Evora, Exige and Elise.

Racing

Several Exiges are currently in use in the SCCA Pro Racing World Challenge. An Exige GT3 and some CUP Exige race in the Supercar Challenge. An Exige has participated in the GT300 class of the 2005 Super GT Series season.

Simply Sports Cars in Australia ran an Exige Cup R in endurance racing during 2014 and 2015 at the world renowned Bathurst 12 Hour, with class wins on both occasions.

See also 
 Hennessey Venom GT, an American supercar built on a modified Lotus Exige chassis
 List of rally cars

References

External links 

 Lotus official website
 Exige 265E review
 Article on Exige 265E by GreenerMachine.com
 2008 Lotus Exige S 240 Review and specs; Sport Compact Car Magazine
 Lotus Exige Owners Club

Sports cars
Exige
Rear mid-engine, rear-wheel-drive vehicles
2010s cars
Cars introduced in 2000